Dame Rajkumari Bibiji Amrit Kaur (née Ahluwalia) DStJ (2 February 1887 – 6 February 1964) was an Indian activist and politician. Following her long-lasting association with the Indian independence movement, she was appointed the first Health Minister of India  in 1947 and remained in office until 1957. She also held the charge of Sports Minister and Urban Development Minister and was instrumental in setting up the National Institute of Sports, Patiala. During her tenure, Kaur ushered in several healthcare reforms in India and is widely remembered for her contributions to the sector and her advocacy of women's rights. Kaur was also a member of the Constituent Assembly of India, the body that framed the Constitution of India.

Life

Amrit Kaur was born on 2 February 1887 in Badshah Bagh, Lucknow University Campus, Lucknow, Uttar Pradesh (then North-Western Provinces), India. Kaur was born to Raja Sir Harnam Singh Ahluwalia the younger son of the Raja Randhir Singh of Kapurthala. Harnam Singh left Kapurthala following a conflict over succession to the throne, becoming the manager of estates in the former princely state of Oudh, and converted to Christianity on the urging of Golakhnath Chatterjee, a missionary from Bengal, Singh later married Chatterjee's daughter, Priscilla, and they had ten children, of which Amrit Kaur was the youngest, and their only daughter.

Kaur was raised as a Protestant Christian, and had her early education in Sherborne School For Girls in Dorset, England, and had her college education at Oxford University. After completing her education in England, she returned to India in 1918.

Kaur died in New Delhi on 6 February 1964. Although she was, at the time of her death, a practicing Protestant Christian, she was cremated in accordance with Sikh custom. Kaur never married, and had no children.

Today, her private papers are part of the Archives at the Nehru Memorial Museum & Library, at Teen Murti House, Delhi.

Career

Participation in India's Independence Movement

After her return to India from England, Kaur became interested in the Indian independence movement. Her father had shared close association with Indian National Congress leaders including Gopal Krishna Gokhale, who often visited them. Kaur was drawn to the thoughts and vision of Mahatma Gandhi, whom she met in Bombay (Mumbai) in 1919. Kaur worked as Gandhi's secretary for 16 years, and their correspondence was subsequently published as a volume of letters titled 'Letters to Rajkumari Amrit Kaur'.

Following the Jallianwala Bagh massacre later that year, when the British forces shot and killed over 400 peaceful protestors in Amritsar, Punjab, Kaur became a strong critic of the British rule in India. She formally joined the Congress and began active participation in India's independence movement while also focusing on bringing about social reform. She was strongly opposed to the practice of purdah and to child marriage, and campaigned to abolish the devadasi system in India.

Kaur co-founded the All India Women's Conference in 1927. She was later appointed its secretary in 1930, and president in 1933. She was imprisoned by the British authorities for her participation in the Dandi March, led by Mahatama Gandhi in 1930. Kaur went to live at Gandhi's ashram in 1934 and adopted an austere lifestyle despite her aristocratic background.

As a representative of the Indian National Congress, in 1937 she went on a mission of goodwill to Bannu, in the present-day Khyber-Pakhtunkhwa. The British Raj authorities charged her with sedition and imprisoned her.

The British authorities appointed her as a member of the Advisory Board of Education, but she resigned from the position following her involvement with the Quit India Movement in 1942. She was imprisoned by the authorities for her actions during the time.

She championed the cause of universal suffrage, and testified before the Lothian Committee on Indian franchise and constitutional reforms, and before the Joint Select Committee of British Parliament on Indian constitutional reforms.

Kaur served as the Chairperson of the All India Women's Education Fund Association. She was a member of the Executive Committee of Lady Irwin College in New Delhi. She was sent as a member of the Indian delegation to UNESCO conferences in London and Paris in 1945 and 1946, respectively. She also served as a member of the Board of Trustees of the All India Spinners' Association.

Kaur worked to reduce illiteracy, and eradicate the custom of child marriages and the purdah system for women, which were then prevalent among some Indian communities.

Member of the Constituent Assembly 

Following India's independence from the colonial rule in August 1947, Kaur was elected from the United Provinces to the Indian Constituent Assembly, the government body that was assigned to design the Constitution of India. She was also a member of Sub-Committee on Fundamental Rights and Sub-Committee on Minorities. As a member of the Constituent Assembly, she supported a proposal for a Uniform Civil Code in India. She also advocated for universal franchise, opposed affirmative action for women, and debated the language concerning the protection of religious rights.

Health Minister 
After India's independence, Amrit Kaur became part of Jawaharlal Nehru's first Cabinet; she was the first woman to hold Cabinet rank, serving for ten years. In January 1949, she was appointed a Dame of the Order of Saint John (DStJ). She was assigned the Ministry of Health. In 1950, she was elected the president of World Health Assembly. As Health Minister, Kaur led a major campaign to fight the spread of malaria in India. She also led the campaign to eradicate tuberculosis and was the driving force behind the largest B.C.G vaccination programme in the world.

As the health minister, Kaur played an instrumental role in establishment of the All India Institute of Medical Sciences (AIIMS) in New Delhi, and became its first president. Kaur introduced a bill in the Lok Sabha for the establishment of AIIMS in 1956, following a recommendation made after the Government of India conducted a national health survey. Kaur was instrumental in raising funds for the establishment of AIIMS, securing aid from New Zealand, Australia, West Germany, Sweden, and the United States. She and one of her brothers donated their ancestral property and house (named Manorville) in Simla, Himachal Pradesh to serve as a holiday home for the staff and nurses of the Institute.

Kaur was also instrumental in founding the Indian Council of Child Welfare. Kaur served as the Chairperson of the Indian Red Cross society for fourteen years. During her leadership, the Indian Red Cross did a number of pioneering works in the hinterlands of India. She served on the boards of governmental bodies aimed at fighting tuberculosis and leprosy. She started the Amrit Kaur College of Nursing and the National Sports Club of India.

Rajkumari Amrit Kaur played a key role in the development of College of Nursing, New Delhi (established in 1946), Government of India renamed the college as Rajkumari Amrit Kaur College of Nursing in her honor.

From 1957 until her death in 1964, she remained a member of Rajya Sabha. Between 1958 and 1963 Kaur was the president of the All-India Motor Transport Congress in Delhi. Until her death, she continued to hold the presidencies of the All India Institute of Medical Sciences, the Tuberculosis Association of India, and the St. John's Ambulance Corps.  She also was awarded the Rene Sand Memorial Award, and was named TIME Magazine's Woman of the Year in 1947.

References

Further reading

India’s 50 Most Illustrious Women by Indra Gupta

External links
The Tribune, Chandigarh

First Nehru ministry
1880s births
1964 deaths
Politicians from Lucknow
People from Kapurthala
Indian rebels
Indian women in war
Prisoners and detainees of British India
Dames of the Order of St John
Rajya Sabha members from Punjab, India
India MPs 1952–1957
Members of the Constituent Assembly of India
People educated at Sherborne Girls
Gandhians
Expatriates of British India in the United Kingdom
Women in war 1900–1945
Health ministers of India
Punjabi people
Indian people of World War II
Indian women of World War II
20th-century Indian women politicians
20th-century Indian politicians
Women members of the Lok Sabha
Members of the Cabinet of India
Women members of the Cabinet of India
Women members of the Rajya Sabha
Kapurthala State
Ahluwalia
Indian female royalty